Ellis Darren Chapman (born 8 January 2001) is an English professional footballer who plays as a midfielder for Oldham Athletic on loan from Cheltenham Town.

Career
Chapman came through the Lincoln City youth-team, before being purchased by Leicester City's Academy for an undisclosed fee in 2016. He returned to Lincoln City the following year and made the first-team bench in September 2017, at the age of 16, after impressing "Imps" manager Danny Cowley. He made his senior debut on 24 October, coming on as a 70th-minute substitute for Michael Bostwick in a 2–1 victory over Everton U23 in an EFL Trophy group stage match at Sincil Bank.

Cheltenham Town
On 15 October 2020, it was announced that Chapman had joined Cheltenham Town, with Lincoln City retaining a future financial interest in the player.

On 17 November 2022, Chapman signed for National League club Oldham Athletic on a one-month loan deal.

Style of play
Chapman is a midfielder with excellent passing skills and good tactical intelligence.

Career statistics

Honours
Lincoln City
EFL Trophy: 2017–18

Cheltenham Town
League Two Champions: 2020-21

References

2001 births
Living people
Sportspeople from Lincoln, England
English footballers
Association football midfielders
Cheltenham Town F.C. players
Chesterfield F.C. players
Lincoln City F.C. players
Leicester City F.C. players
Oldham Athletic A.F.C. players
English Football League players
National League (English football) players